Trichotanypus is a genus of flies belonging to the family Chironomidae.

The species of this genus are found in Northern Europe and Northern America.

Species:
 Trichotanypus abditus (Kieffer, 1924) 
 Trichotanypus aberrata Makarchenko, 1983

References

Chironomidae